Heinz Emmerich (25 February 1908 – 10 March 1986) was a German international footballer.

References

1908 births
1986 deaths
Association football defenders
German footballers
Germany international footballers
Tennis Borussia Berlin players